Scottish Students may refer to:
 Coalition of Higher Education Students in Scotland
 Federation of Student Nationalists
 National Union of Students Scotland
 Scottish Conservative and Unionist Students
 Scottish Labour Students
 A former rugby union team that competed in the 1994 Women's Rugby World Cup